Marie Rivière (born 22 December 1956) is a French actress and filmmaker. She is known for her collaborations with director Éric Rohmer.

From a working-class background, Marie Rivière grew up on a housing estate/project in Montreuil before working as a schoolteacher, then as a shop assistant. At 21, having seen  L'Amour l'après-midi, she sent a letter and photo to  Éric Rohmer. He saw her in his office at Les films du losange, in the presence of Arielle Dombasle and Thierry Lhermitte, and offered her a small role in Perceval le Gallois.  Two years later she appeared in Rohmer's The Aviator's Wife, the first in the Comédies et Proverbes series. The Green Ray, in which she played the fragile dreamer Delphine, was a critical and popular success, and won the Golden Lion at Venice.  In 1998 she appeared again for Rohmer in Conte d'automne (Autumn Tale),  alongside another Rohmer muse, Béatrice Romand.

She co-directed her first film in 1993, with Marc Rivière, La Règle du Silence.

Filmography

Theater

Author

References

External links
 
 marie riviere.com

Living people
1956 births
French film actresses
French television actresses
People from Montreuil, Seine-Saint-Denis
20th-century French actresses
21st-century French actresses
French stage actresses
French women film directors
French women screenwriters
French screenwriters
French cinematographers
French women cinematographers
French film editors
French film producers
French women film producers
French women film editors